Gudeok Baseball Stadium was a baseball stadium in Busan, South Korea. It was the former home stadium of the Lotte Giants. It holds 11,724 people and was built in 1971. The stadium was demolished on 19 September 2017.

References

Baseball venues in South Korea
Sports venues in Busan
Lotte Giants
Sports venues completed in 1971